Tabre is a commune in the Ariège department in southwestern France.

Population

Inhabitants of Tabre are called Tabréens.

See also
Communes of the Ariège department

References

Communes of Ariège (department)
Ariège communes articles needing translation from French Wikipedia